The Early Entrance Program (EEP) is an early college entrance program for gifted individuals of middle-school and high school ages at California State University, Los Angeles (CSULA), United States, based on a similar program of the same name at the University of Washington's Seattle campus (the Transition School and Early Entrance Program). The program allows participants to skip normal schooling and become full-time, degree-seeking college students.  Among early college entrance programs in the United States, EEP (along with programs like UW Academy for Young Scholars) has adopted a different approach. Instead of offering a preparatory year, like Transition School students, or the more common model of dual enrollment, students are admitted directly into the university.  Applicants to EEP largely come from the Greater Los Angeles Area, but some move from elsewhere in the United States or from other countries to attend.

Administration 

The Director of the Early Entrance Program acts both as a principal and an academic advisor or counselor. Richard Maddox, EdD, the principal from 1995 to 2018, is responsible for much of EEP's current structure. He has also pushed for more publicity, promoting EEP to nationally recognized status. EEP is now under the jurisdiction of the Director of the Honors College, with an EEP Assistant Director overseeing daily operations. The current Assistant Director is Andrea Arias, EdD.

Application Process 

Every year, approximately 100-500 students apply to EEP. Previously, after taking the ACT or SAT and undergoing a rigorous assessment period taking college-level courses during the "Honors Academy", 20 to 35 applicants were accepted.

Interviews

To apply, students must first schedule an interview with the Early Entrance Program Director. At this interview, prospective candidates are informed briefly about the application process and the Pre-Summer Orientation. Most students pass the interview.

Provisional Family Orientation

Prospective students (formerly referred to as "Provisionals" or "Provies") and their parents are required to attend an orientation with every other candidate for the program. This orientation usually occurs in late May and is coordinated by the EEP Director. Students at this orientation receive information about the various aspects of the summer application process.

Provisional Summer Semester

The Provisional Summer Semester is a part of the evaluation process that allows prospective students to experience a similar environment to EEP. Prospective students must take three courses at CSULA and maintain a minimum 3.0 GPA for the summer quarter (which spans approximately 6 weeks). They are also encouraged to spend time in the EEP Lounge (King Hall D140-142) with other prospective and regular students.   

There are three Provisional Freshmen Orientations that take place during the summer quarter. Unlike the Pre-Summer Orientation, these orientations are for prospective students without their parents.  At the first meeting, every prospective student joins a Mentor Group. Mentors are regular students in the program that volunteer to help with the summer application process by assisting and assessing prospective students.

By the sixth to seventh week of the provisional semester, 25 to 40 of the most capable students have advanced to EEP candidacy status. These students are admitted to the EEP and begin classes at CSULA the following fall semester.

Students 

There are approximately 120 students in the Early Entrance Program, known as "EEPsters". EEPsters come from a variety of social, ethnic, and economical backgrounds. Their varied personalities and experiences contribute to a unique environment often considered a social asylum from the typical American educational environment.

Transition to University Life

The program takes several intermediary steps ensure a smooth transition from a secondary school setting to university life. EEPsters have access to a lounge to socialize with each other and are supported by a full-time staff, which consists of a Student Counselor and a Student Assistant. Additionally, a Study Hall was recently added to freshman curricula. Support and guidance from families and older EEPsters help most freshmen adjust quickly to collegiate life. Older EEPsters often become active participants in university life, assimilating inconspicuously into roles of community service, organizations, and student governments.

Clubs and Organizations

EEPsters have participated in many of CSULA's on-campus clubs and organizations, including General Education Honors Club, Associated Students Incorporated (ASI Student Governance), and multiple research laboratories. The Early Entrance Program Club (EEPC) also provides a social outlet and community for EEPsters.

Notable alumni 

 Leana Wen, physician, public health advocate, author and Director of Planned Parenthood.
 G.J. Echternkamp, director of Frank and Cindy.
Nika Nour, Executive Director of the International Game Developers Association Foundation

References

Gifted education